The Ottoman invasion of Otranto occurred between 1480 and 1481 at the Italian city of Otranto in Apulia, southern Italy. Forces of the Ottoman Empire invaded and laid siege to the city, they captured it on 11 August 1480 establishing the first Ottoman outpost in Italy. According to a traditional account, more than 800 inhabitants were beheaded after the city was captured.  The Martyrs of Otranto are still celebrated in Italy. A year later the Ottoman garrison surrendered the city following a siege by Christian forces, uncertainty upon the death of Sultan Mehmed the Conqueror and the intervention of papal forces led by the Genoese Paolo Fregoso.

Background
The attack on Otranto was part of an abortive attempt by the Ottomans to invade and conquer Italy—especially Rome. In the summer of 1480, a force of nearly 20,000 Ottoman Turks under the command of Gedik Ahmed Pasha invaded southern Italy. The first part of the plan was to capture the port city of Otranto. The 15 years long war between the Republic of Venice and the Ottoman Sultanate, the two most dominant powers, in terms of trade and military force, over the whole of the Mediterranean Sea, including the Black Sea, had just ended resulting in the  Peace of Constantinople. Sultan Mehmed II Fatih had declared himself "Kaysar-i Rûm" after taking control of Constantinople in 1453, restoring the Greek Orthodox Church, but banning the Roman Catholics.

Invasion of Italy

Siege
On 28 July, an Ottoman fleet of 128 ships, including 28 galleys, arrived near the Neapolitan city of Otranto. Many of these troops had come from the siege of Rhodes. The garrison and citizens of Otranto retreated to the Castle of Otranto. On 11 August, after a 15-day siege, Gedik Ahmed ordered the final assault. When the walls were breached the Turkish army methodically passed from house to house, sacking, looting, and setting them on fire. Upon reaching the cathedral, "they found Archbishop Stefano Agricolo, fully vested and crucifix in hand" awaiting them with Count Francesco Largo, the garrison commander and Bishop Stefano Pendinelli, who distributed the Eucharist and sat with the women and children of Otranto while a Dominican friar led the faithful in prayer. A total of 12,000 were killed and 5,000 enslaved, including victims from the territories of the Salentine peninsula around the city, and the cathedral turned into a mosque.

Martyrs of Otranto

The Martyrs of Otranto were collectively canonized as saints by the Roman Catholic Church on 12 May 2013. Their remains are claimed to be stored today in Otranto Cathedral and in the church of Santa Caterina a Formiello in Naples.

The traditional Christian historiography has come under criticism by later historians. Recent scholarship has questioned whether conversion was imposed as a condition for clemency. Although one contemporary Ottoman account justifies the massacre on religious grounds, Ilenia Romana Cassetta writes that it seems rather to have been a punitive action whose goal was intimidation.

Stalled advance
In August, 70 ships of the fleet attacked Vieste. On 12 September, the Monastero di San Nicholas di Casole, which accommodated one of the richer libraries of Europe, was destroyed. By October attacks had been conducted against the coastal cities of Lecce, Taranto, and Brindisi.

However, due to lack of supplies, the Ottoman commander, Gedik Ahmed Pasha, did not consolidate his force's advance. Instead he returned with most of his troops to Albania leaving a garrison of 800 infantry and 500 sipahi behind to defend Otranto. It was assumed he would return with his army after the winter.

Catholic response
Since it was only 27 years after the fall of Constantinople, there was some fear that Rome would suffer the same fate. Plans were made for the Pope and citizens of Rome to evacuate the city. Pope Sixtus IV repeated his 1471 call for a crusade. Several Italian city-states, Hungary, and France responded positively to this. The Republic of Venice did not, as it had signed an expensive peace treaty with the Ottomans in 1479.

In April 1481 Sixtus IV called for an Italian crusade to liberate the city, and Christian forces besieged Otranto in May. An army was raised by King Ferdinand I of Naples to be led by his son Alfonso, Duke of Calabria. A contingent of troops was provided by King Matthias Corvinus of Hungary.

Recapture
Between August and September, King Ferdinand of Naples, with the help of his cousin Ferdinand the Catholic and the Kingdom of Sicily, tried unsuccessfully to recapture Otranto. The Christian forces besieged the city on 1 May 1481. Turkish Sultan Mehmed the Conqueror was preparing for a new campaign on Italy but he lost his life on 3 May. Ongoing succession issues prevented the Ottomans from sending reinforcements to Otranto. After the negotiation with the Christian forces, the Turks surrendered in August and left Otranto in September 1481, ending the 13-month occupation.

Aftermath

The number of citizens, said to have been nearly 20,000, had decreased to 8,000 by the end of the century. 500 Sipahis settled in Otranto by Gedik Ahmet Pasha went into the service of the King Ferdinand of Naples when the control of the region passed to the Kingdom of Naples. With these 500 Sipahis, the Kingdom of Naples dominated other wars in Italy.

The Ottomans had also briefly held Otranto once more after conquering it in 1537.

See also

 History of Islam in southern Italy
 Martyrs of Otranto
 Da Vinci's Demons (fictional work, part of which portrays the invasion)

References

Further reading
Hubert Houben, ed. La conquista turca di Otranto (1480) tra storia e mito: atti del convegno internazionale di studio, Otranto–Muro Leccese, 28–31 marzo 2007. 2 vols. Galatina, 2008.

External links
 En.otrantopoint.com
 Zum.de
 Borghitalia.it
 Castellipuglia.org
 Uni-mannheim.de
 Cronologia.leonardo.it
 Museomuro.it
 How the Eight Hundred Men of Otranto Saved Rome

Battles involving the Ottoman Empire
1480 in Europe
1481 in Europe
15th century in the Kingdom of Naples
Otranto, Battle of
Otranto, Battle of
Conflicts in 1480
Conflicts in 1481
Mehmed the Conqueror
1480 in the Ottoman Empire
Ottoman–Spanish conflicts
Otranto